Mohcine Besri (born 1971) is a Moroccan actor, writer, Producer and director.

Career
In 2011, he wrote and directed the film, The Miscreants (French original title: Les mécréants), which he also produced alongside Michel Merkt, Michaël Rouzeau and Nicolas Wadimoff. The film starred Jamila El Haouini, Maria Lalouaz, Amine Ennaji, Abdenbi El Beniwi, Rabii Benjhaile and others. The film was reportedly released by the online streaming service Filmatigue around 2017.

In 2018, he directed the film, Urgent (French original title: Une urgence ordinaire), and screenplayed it with Cécile  Vargaftig. It was produced by Elisa Garbar, Lamia Chraibi and Michel Merkt, and featured cast like Rachid Mustapha, Fatima Zahra Bennacer, Youssef Alaoui, Ayoub Layoussifi and others. The film was premiered in the 2018 Marrakech International Film Festival (MIFF) and in the 2019 Palm Springs International Film Festival and Tangier National Film Festival 2019. At the 15th Africa Movie Academy Awards (AMAA) in 2016, he was nominated in the "Best Director" award category for the film Urgent. The film also got about four other nominations.

Still in 2018, he wrote and directed the feature drama film titled, Laaziza. The film featured cast like Fatima Zahra Benacer, Omar Lotfi, Rachid Elouali and Zakaria Atifi. The film was reportedly screened at the 40th Cairo International Film Festival.

Filmography

Accolades

References

External links
 Mohcine Besri on IMDb

1971 births 
Moroccan film directors 
Moroccan film producers 
Moroccan screenwriters 
Moroccan actors
Living people
People from Meknes